Oklahoma's 5th congressional district  is a congressional district in the U.S. state of Oklahoma. It borders all of the other congressional districts in the state except the 1st district. It is densely populated and covers almost all of Oklahoma County (except a small sliver located in the 4th district) and all of Pottawatomie and Seminole counties. Although it leans firmly Republican, with a Cook PVI rating of R+12, it is still considered the least Republican district in the state.

Principal cities in the district include Oklahoma City (the state capital), Edmond, Shawnee, and Seminole.

The district is currently represented by Republican Stephanie Bice. She was first elected in 2020, defeating one-term incumbent Democrat Kendra Horn.

History
Prior to the opening of the 116th Congress on January 3, 2019, the district had been held by a Republican since January 23, 1975, when Democrat John Jarman changed political parties. Before Jarman, the seat had leaned Democratic since 1931.

Donald Trump received 53.2 percent of the vote in this district in 2016 and 51.4% of the vote in 2020.

Kendra Horn received 50.7 percent of the vote in 2018.

Demographics
According to the APM Research Lab's Voter Profile Tools (featuring the U.S. Census Bureau's 2019 American Community Survey), the district contained about 572,000 potential voters (citizens, age 18+). Of these, 66% are White, 13% Black, and 9% Latino. Immigrants make up 5% of the district's potential voters. Median income among households (with one or more potential voter) in the district is about $55,800, while 13% of households live below the poverty line. As for the educational attainment of potential voters in the district, 10% of those 25 and older have not earned a high school degree, while 30% hold a bachelor's or higher degree.

Recent election results from state-wide races

List of members representing the district

Historical district boundaries

Recent election results

2006

2008

2010

2012

2014

2016

2018

2020

2022

See also

Oklahoma's congressional districts
List of United States congressional districts

References

 Congressional Biographical Directory of the United States 1774–present

05